Five On Kirrin Island Again is the sixth novel in the Famous Five series by Enid Blyton. It was first published in October 1947.

Plot
Julian, Dick, Anne and George had planned to visit Kirrin Island for their school holidays, but George's father, Uncle Quentin, is using the island to conduct some secretive scientific experiments. George is frustrated with his idea. But agrees to lend her island to her father until he completes his experiment. Uncle Quentin is later kidnapped by villains wanting his secret formula for alternative energy. Uncle Quentin is held in a sub-sea tunnel, and it is up to the Five to rescue him. During the adventure,Timmy plays an important part in rescuing Uncle Quentin from the kidnappers. The children befriend an artistic boy named Martin, whose guardian, Mr Curton, is part of the gang trying to steal the secret formula. After the rescue Martin is admitted in a Art School and is free from his guardian. Everything ends happily.

Adaptation
The book inspired a 2012 German film, Fünf Freunde.

External links
 
Five on Kirrin Island Again at www.enidblyton.net
Enid Blyton Society page

1947 British novels
Novels set on islands
Hodder & Stoughton books
Famous Five novels
British novels adapted into films
1947 children's books